Gennaro Sanfelice (1622 – 19 February 1694) was a Roman Catholic prelate who served as Archbishop of Cosenza (1661–1694).

Biography
Gennaro Sanfelice was born in Naples, Italy in 1622. On 21 November 1661, he was appointed during the papacy of Pope Alexander VII as Archbishop of Cosenza. On 30 November 1661, he was consecrated bishop by Giulio Cesare Sacchetti, Cardinal-Bishop of Sabina, with Ottaviano Carafa, Titular Archbishop of Patrae, and Emilio Bonaventura Altieri, Bishop of Camerino, serving as co-consecrators. He served as Archbishop of Cosenza until his death on 19 February 1694.

References

External links and additional sources
 (for Chronology of Bishops) 
 (for Chronology of Bishops) 

17th-century Italian Roman Catholic archbishops
Bishops appointed by Pope Alexander VII
Clergy from Naples
1622 births
1694 deaths